Iveta Benešová and Barbora Záhlavová-Strýcová were the defending champions but Benešová decided not to participate.
Záhlavová-Strýcová plays alongside Petra Cetkovská, but they were knocked out in the semifinals by the top-seeded pair of Sara Errani and Roberta Vinci who beat Francesca Schiavone and Flavia Pennetta 6–0, 6–2 in an all-Italian final.

Seeds

Draw

Draw

References
 Main Draw

Doubles